Lake Diatas (means: Upper Lake; Minangnese: Danau Diateh) is a lake in West Sumatra, Indonesia. This lake together with Lake Dibawah, are known as the Twin Lakes (Danau Kembar).

See also
 List of lakes of Indonesia

Diatas
Landforms of West Sumatra